Carex bushii, Bush's sedge, is a species of sedge in the genus Carex. It native to the eastern United States where it is found in areas of natural grassland.

Carex bushii is distinguished from the similar Carex caroliniana, Carex complanata, and Carex hirsutella by having pistillate scales that are at least as long as the perigynia (the covering of the achene).

References

bushii
Flora of the Southeastern United States
Flora of Texas
Flora of the North-Central United States
Flora of the Northeastern United States
Plants described in 1910
Taxa named by Kenneth Kent Mackenzie
Flora without expected TNC conservation status